Trenčianska Turná is a village and municipality in Trenčín District in the Trenčín Region of north-western Slovakia. It has a population of about 3043 people (2008).

History
In historical records the village was first mentioned in 1269. The area of village on 3 August 1708 the battle between the Habsburg army of General Heister and Kuruc Army of Francis II Rákóczi took place.

Trenčianska Turná merged with a neighboring village Hámre in 1976.

Geography
The municipality lies at an altitude of 214 metres and covers an area of 17.239 km2. Trenčianska Turná lies to the North of the Považský Inovec Mts. in the southern portion of the Trenčín Basin. Located near road I/50 connecting the towns Trenčín and Bánovce nad Bebravou. Creek Turniansky potok flows through the village. The northern slopes of the Považský Inovec Mts. are rich on mineral springs. Presence of the springs is considered as a result of circulation of groundwater near the Inovec fault.

External links
http://www.statistics.sk/mosmis/eng/run.html

Villages and municipalities in Trenčín District